A Small Silence is a 2019 novel by Nigerian poet and writer Jumoke Verissimo.

Plot 
A Small Silence tells the story of Prof. who never turns on the light in his Lagos apartment where a female spirit who he can't see always visit him. The spirit who can't see him too, visits him only at night.

References

2019 Nigerian novels
Cassava Republic Press books